Steve Madere was the founder and CEO of Deja News (now Google Groups) and holds a Masters in Science degree in physics from the University of California, San Diego.
He has held numerous other positions at other firms including IBM, The Kernel Group (now Symantec), Barfly Interactive Networks, an interactive signage company in Austin, Texas and founded the Advisory board to Journyx.

Honors

On December 2, 1998, the Austin chapter of the Association of Information Technology Professionals (AITP) named Madere "Austin Information Technologist of the Year".

References
    

American businesspeople
Living people
University of California, San Diego alumni
Year of birth missing (living people)
Companies based in Austin, Texas